Dycoderus is a genus of Nearctic true bugs in the family Oxycarenidae. There is one described species in Dycoderus, D. picturatus.

References

External links

 

Lygaeoidea
Articles created by Qbugbot